is a former Japanese football player who last featured for Giravanz Kitakyushu.

Career statistics
Updated to 2 February 2018.

References

External links

1982 births
Living people
Osaka University of Health and Sport Sciences alumni
Association football people from Wakayama Prefecture
Japanese footballers
J1 League players
J2 League players
J3 League players
Cerezo Osaka players
Montedio Yamagata players
Giravanz Kitakyushu players
Association football defenders